Insel der Zärtlichkeit – Demis Roussos und seine 20 Welterfolge is a greatest hits album by Greek singer Demis Roussos, released in 1980 by Polystar / Phonogram GmbH.

Commercial performance 
The album reached no. 1 in Austria (and spent a total of 26 weeks in the Austrian chart in 1980–1981) and no. 2 in Germany.

Track listing

Charts

Certifications

References

External links 
 Demis Roussos – Insel der Zärtlichkeit at Discogs

1980 compilation albums
Demis Roussos albums
Philips Records albums